The Fulton County School System is a school district headquartered in Sandy Springs, Georgia, United States. The system serves the area of Fulton County outside the Atlanta city limits (which are served by Atlanta Public Schools).  Fulton County Schools serve the cities of Alpharetta, Johns Creek, Milton, Mountain Park, Roswell, and Sandy Springs north of Atlanta, and Chattahoochee Hills, College Park, East Point, Fairburn, Hapeville, Palmetto, Union City, and Fulton's remaining unincorporated areas in the south.  Fulton County is the fourth-largest school system in Georgia.

The Fulton County school district is the only non-contiguous school district in the state, having a 17-mile (27 km) separation (Atlanta Public Schools) between the north and south.

As of the 2012–2013 school year, Fulton has 11,500 full-time employees, including 7,500 teachers and other certified personnel, who work in 99 schools and 15 administrative and support buildings. Approximately 94,000 students attend classes in 58 elementary schools, 19 middle schools, 19 high schools, and seven charter schools.

Fulton County Schools is overseen by a seven-member board, all of whom are elected by geographic electoral district to four-year terms. Members of the Fulton County Board of Education are elected to four-year terms. Elections are held in even-numbered years. As of 2019, the school members include: District 1 - Katha Stuart, District 2 - Katie Reeves, District 3 - Gail Dean, District 4 - Linda Bryant, District 5 - Linda McCain, District 6 - Kimberly Dove, District 7 - Julia Bernath.

Territory

Operations
The district headquarters is in Sandy Springs. The district has another Sandy Springs office and one in Union City.

Previously the school district was headquartered in Atlanta. The district moved its headquarters in the period September 2014 through June 2015, citing how the majority of students live in the northern portions of the counties. The district maintains the Union City office for people living in the southern portion. Wayne Washington of The Atlanta Journal-Constitution wrote in 2013 that "There have long been complaints from some parents that the southern part of the [...] district has been neglected in favor of the faster-growing, more affluent northern part."

Schools

Charter schools
 Amana Academy
 Dunwoody Springs Charter Elementary School
 Fulton County Connected Academy
 Fulton Academy of Science and Technology (FAST)
 Hapeville Middle School
 KIPP South Fulton Academy
 The Main Street Academy
 Sandy Springs Charter Middle School
 North Springs Charter School of Arts and Sciences
 Ridgeview Charter Middle School
 Riverwood International Charter School
 Spalding Drive Charter Elementary School
 T.E.A.C.H
 Woodland Charter Elementary School

Alpharetta Cluster
 Alpharetta High School
 Creek View Elementary School
 FCS Innovation Academy
 Lake Windward Elementary School
 Manning Oaks Elementary School
 New Prospect Elementary School
 Webb Bridge Middle School

Banneker Cluster
 Benjamin E. Banneker High School
 Mary McLeod Bethune Elementary School
 Crossroads Second Chance South
 Heritage Elementary School
 S.L. Lewis Elementary School
 Ronald E. McNair Middle School
 Love T. Nolan Elementary School
 Feldwood Elementary School

Cambridge Cluster
 Cambridge High School
 Hopewell Middle School
 Northwestern Middle School
 Summit Hill Elementary School
 Manning Oaks Elementary School
 Cogburn Woods Elementary School
 Esther Jackson Elementary School (Alpharetta Elementary School) - Occupied a temporary site until 2016, when it received its current name and entered a new facility built on the site of the old one.
 Birmingham Falls Elementary School

Centennial Cluster
 Centennial High School
 Haynes Bridge Middle School
 Hillside Elementary School
 Holcomb Bridge Middle School
 Esther Jackson Elementary School
 Northwood Elementary School
 River Eves Elementary School
 Barnwell Elementary School (has students in Johns Creek cluster)

Chattahoochee Cluster
 Chattahoochee High School
 Abbotts Hill Elementary School
 Findley Oaks Elementary School
 Ocee Elementary School
 State Bridge Crossing Elementary School
 Taylor Road Middle School

Creekside Cluster
 Creekside High School
 Bear Creek Middle School
 Campbell Elementary School
 Oakley Elementary School
 Palmetto Elementary School
 Evoline C. West Elementary School

Johns Creek Cluster
 Johns Creek High School
 Autrey Mill Middle School
 Barnwell Elementary School (has students in Centennial cluster)
 Dolvin Elementary School
 Medlock Bridge Elementary School

Langston Hughes Cluster
 Langston Hughes High School
 Cliftondale Elementary School
 Gullatt Elementary School
 Liberty Point Elementary School
 Renaissance Elementary School
 Renaissance Middle School

Milton Cluster
 Milton High School
 Alpharetta Elementary School
 Birmingham Falls Elementary School
 Crabapple Crossing Elementary School
 Hopewell Middle School
 Northwestern Middle School
 Summit Hill Elementary School

North Springs Cluster
 North Springs Charter School of Arts and Sciences
 Dunwoody Springs Charter Elementary School
 Ison Springs Elementary School
 Sandy Springs Charter Middle School
 Spalding Drive Charter Elementary School
 Woodland Charter Elementary School

Northview Cluster
 Northview High School
 Findley Oaks Elementary School
 River Trail Middle School
 Shakerag Elementary School
 Wilson Creek Elementary School

Riverwood Cluster
 Riverwood High School
 Heards Ferry Elementary School
 High Point Elementary School
 Lake Forest Elementary School
 Ridgeview Charter Middle School

Roswell Cluster
 Roswell High School
 Independence High School (Alternative School)
 Crabapple Middle School
 Crossroads Second Chance North
 Elkins Pointe Middle School
 Hembree Springs Elementary School
 Mimosa Elementary School
 Mountain Park Elementary School
 Roswell North Elementary School
 Sweet Apple Elementary School

Tri-Cities Cluster
 Tri-Cities High School
 Brookview Elementary School
 College Park Elementary School
 Conley Hills Elementary School
 Asa Grant Hilliard Elementary School
 Hamilton E. Holmes Elementary School
 Hapeville Elementary School
 Parklane Elementary School
 Harriet Tubman Elementary School
 Paul D. West Middle School
 Woodland Middle School

Hilliard Elementary, named after former East Point resident Asa Grant Hilliard III, opened in 2016 on the site of the former Mount Olive Elementary School, which opened in 1960. Mount Olive was replaced by Hilliard, with the former building razed in 2014. Mount Olive had a temporary site in 2014–2015 in East Point, with the new building and new name in effect in August 2015.

Oak Knoll Elementary School closed. Since 2015 it houses RISE Grammar School/RISE Prep School (which together serve K-8), which purchased the facility for $1.73 million in May 2018.

Westlake Cluster
 Westlake High School
 Camp Creek Middle School
 Seaborn Lee Elementary School
 Frank D. McClarin Success Academy
 A. Philip Randolph Elementary School
 Sandtown Middle School
 Stonewall Tell Elementary School

References

External links
 Fulton County School System's Current Board Members

School districts in Georgia (U.S. state)
Education in Fulton County, Georgia